Sebastian Stalder (born 19 January 1998) is a Swiss biathlete. He competed in the 2022 Winter Olympics.

Career
Stalder started biathlon in 2012. He won a bronze medal at 2020 Junior World Championships. He competed in multiple biathlon events at the 2022 Winter Olympics. He was part of the Swiss team in the mixed relay, placing 8th out of 20 teams. He placed 53rd in the individual event, 27th in the sprint, and 36th in the pursuit.

Personal life
Stalder has a younger brother, Gion, and a younger sister, Selina, who also compete in biathlon. Stalder also competes in crossbow shooting.

References

1998 births
Living people
Biathletes at the 2022 Winter Olympics
Swiss male biathletes
Olympic biathletes of Switzerland
Biathletes at the 2016 Winter Youth Olympics
Sportspeople from the canton of Zürich